Union Township, Indiana may refer to one of the following places:

 Union Township, Adams County, Indiana
 Union Township, Benton County, Indiana
 Union Township, Boone County, Indiana
 Union Township, Clark County, Indiana
 Union Township, Clinton County, Indiana
 Union Township, Crawford County, Indiana
 Union Township, DeKalb County, Indiana
 Union Township, Delaware County, Indiana
 Union Township, Elkhart County, Indiana
 Union Township, Fulton County, Indiana
 Union Township, Gibson County, Indiana
 Union Township, Hendricks County, Indiana
 Union Township, Howard County, Indiana
 Union Township, Huntington County, Indiana
 Union Township, Jasper County, Indiana
 Union Township, Johnson County, Indiana
 Union Township, LaPorte County, Indiana
 Union Township, Madison County, Indiana
 Union Township, Marshall County, Indiana
 Union Township, Miami County, Indiana
 Union Township, Montgomery County, Indiana
 Union Township, Ohio County, Indiana
 Union Township, Parke County, Indiana
 Union Township, Perry County, Indiana
 Union Township, Porter County, Indiana
 Union Township, Randolph County, Indiana
 Union Township, Rush County, Indiana
 Union Township, St. Joseph County, Indiana
 Union Township, Shelby County, Indiana
 Union Township, Tippecanoe County, Indiana
 Union Township, Union County, Indiana
 Union Township, Vanderburgh County, Indiana
 Union Township, Wells County, Indiana
 Union Township, White County, Indiana
 Union Township, Whitley County, Indiana

See also

 Union Township (disambiguation)

Indiana township disambiguation pages